Kamil Jalil oğlu Jalilov (29 January 1938 – 22 February 2022) was an Azerbaijani musician known for his master expertise playing wind instruments and national folk instruments.

He was the master player of wind instruments such as oboe and Azerbaijani regional folk instruments.

Biography
In 1953, Jalilov started to perform in the age of 15 after being inspired by the local man. After finishing local school number 176, he joined the Asaf Zeynally Music School in Baku and then graduated from Azerbaijan State Conservatory.

During 1970 to 1988, as a musician he toured with concert performances in Egypt, Italy, Poland, India, Lebanon, Syria, and many other countries in Europe, Asia and Africa. He is author of "Azərbaycan təranələri" traditional folk song on oboe.

In 2013, he received Shohrat Order from President of Azerbaijan Ilham Aliyev for contribution in development of performing art.

Jailov died on 22 February 2022, at the age of 84.

Legacy 
Jalilov's recording of the song with balaban was included on the Voyager Golden Record, attached to the Voyager spacecraft as representing mugham, only Azerbaijani song included among many cultural achievements of humanity.

Filmography
 1997: Kamil

Discography
 Azərbaycanım (Nurla Sabah, 2008)

References

External links
 

1938 births
2022 deaths
Azerbaijani folk musicians
Male oboists
Mugham musicians
Soviet Azerbaijani people
Musicians from Baku
Recipients of the Sharaf Order
Recipients of the Shohrat Order
People's Artists of Azerbaijan
Recipients of the Lenin Komsomol Prize